August Kühne (1855–1932) was a German businessman, the co-founder of Kuehne + Nagel, the global transportation and logistics company.

Kühne co-founded Kuehne + Nagel with Friedrich Nagel (1864–1907) in Bremen in 1890.

References

1855 births
1932 deaths
German businesspeople